The following is a list of current and historic public, private, and military airports that operate in the Delaware Valley region of the United States, which includes Philadelphia, the nation's sixth-most populous city, its Pennsylvania suburbs, New Castle and Kent counties in Delaware, and South Jersey.

Airport type descriptions: (COM) commercial airport | (GA) general aviation | (MIL) U.S. military or Air National Guard base

Delaware Valley
Delaware Valley
Delaware Valley
Delaware Valley
Airports